Lake Pucrococha (possibly from Quechua p'ukru gorge, ravine, gully, hollow, valley, qucha lake, lagoon) is a lake in Peru located in the Junín Region, Yauli Province, Marcapomacocha District. It lies south-east of Lake Marcapomacocha.

References

Lakes of Peru
Lakes of Junín Region